

Buildings and structures

Buildings

 c. 1520
 Lupert's Range (third side of the Eton School Yard), with Lupert's Tower, designed by architect Henry Redman, completed at Eton College in England.
 Metz Cathedral in the Duchy of Lorraine completed by construction of south transept.
 Rebuilding of San Giacomo Scossacavalli in Rome begun by Antonio da Sangallo the Younger (completed 1592).
 1521
 Château de Chenonceau built in the French Loire Valley.
 Rebuilding of Hampton Court Palace near London completed by Cardinal Wolsey.
 1522 – Vilnius City wall completed, including the Gate of Dawn.
 1523 – Completion of Saint-Jacques Tower, Paris.
 1525
 Laurentian Library in Florence designed by Michelangelo.
 Rebuilding of St Peter and St Paul's Church, Lavenham, England, probably to the design of John Wastell (died 1515), completed.
 Rebuilding of Segovia Cathedral begun by Juan Gil de Hontañón.
 Palazzo del Te, Mantua, begun by Giulio Romano.

 1527 – Kabuli Bagh Mosque in Panipat, Mughal Empire, built.
 1528 
 St. George's Chapel, Windsor Castle, England completed.
 Zhaosi Hall, Wuxi, China completed.

Events
 Jacopo Sansovino is appointed chief architect and superintendent of properties (Protomaestro or Proto) to the Procurators of San Marco in Venice.

Births
c.1520 – Girolamo Cassar, Maltese architect and engineer (d. c. 1589–92)
1521: April 5 – Francesco Laparelli, Italian architect and engineer (d. 1570)
1527 – Hans Vredeman de Vries, Dutch architect and engineer (d. c. 1607)

Deaths
1520: April 6 – Raphael, Italian painter and architect (b. 1483)

References 

Architecture